Miloslav Ludvík (born 5 September 1963) is a Czech politician and Motol University Hospital director who served as Minister of Health from 2016 to 2017. He is a graduate of the Faculty of Business of the University of Economics, Prague.

References

External links
Profile on the website of ČSSD

1963 births
Czech Social Democratic Party Government ministers
Health ministers of the Czech Republic
Living people
Charles University alumni
Politicians from Prague
Czech hospital administrators